Earl Wilson may refer to:
 Earl Wilson (politician) (1906–1990), U.S. Representative from Indiana
 Earl Wilson (columnist) (1907–1987), U.S. journalist
 Earl Wilson (baseball) (1934–2005), U.S. baseball pitcher
 Earl Wilson (gridiron football) (born 1958), American gridiron football player